Astafjord Church is a parish church of the Church of Norway in Tjeldsund Municipality in Troms og Finnmark county, Norway. It is located in the village of Grov. It is the church for the Astafjord parish which is part of the Trondenes prosti (deanery) in the Diocese of Nord-Hålogaland. The white, concrete church was built in a fan-shaped design in 1978 using plans drawn up by the architect Harald Hille. The church seats about 300 people.

See also
List of churches in Nord-Hålogaland

References

Tjeldsund
Churches in Troms
20th-century Church of Norway church buildings
Churches completed in 1978
1978 establishments in Norway
Fan-shaped churches in Norway
Concrete churches in Norway